Phyllomedusa venusta is a species of frog in the subfamily Phyllomedusinae, found in Colombia and Panama.
Its natural habitats are subtropical or tropical dry forests, subtropical or tropical moist lowland forests, swamps, freshwater marshes, intermittent freshwater marshes, and heavily degraded former forests.
It is threatened by habitat loss.

References

External links

Phyllomedusa
Amphibians of Colombia
Amphibians of Panama
Amphibians described in 1967
Taxonomy articles created by Polbot